Laser linewidth is the spectral linewidth of a laser beam.

Two of the most distinctive characteristics of laser emission are spatial coherence and spectral coherence.  While spatial coherence is related to the beam divergence of the laser, spectral coherence is evaluated by measuring the linewidth of laser radiation.

Theory

History: First derivation of the laser linewidth

The first human-made coherent light source was a maser. The acronym MASER stands for "Microwave Amplification by Stimulated Emission of Radiation". More precisely, it was the ammonia maser operating at 12.5 mm wavelength that was demonstrated by Gordon, Zeiger, and Townes in 1954. One year later the same authors derived theoretically the linewidth of their device by making the reasonable approximations that their ammonia maser

Notably, their derivation was entirely semi-classical, describing the ammonia molecules as quantum emitters and assuming classical electromagnetic fields (but no quantized fields or quantum fluctuations), resulting in the half-width-at-half-maximum (HWHM) maser linewidth

 iv. one photon is coupled into the lasing mode by spontaneous emission during the photon-decay time ,

resulting in the original Schawlow–Townes approximation of the laser linewidth:

Also the transfer from the microwave to the optical regime was entirely semi-classical, without assuming quantized fields or quantum fluctuations. Consequently, the original Schawlow–Townes equation is entirely based on semi-classical physics and is a four-fold approximation of a more general laser linewidth, which will be derived in the following.

Passive resonator mode: Photon-decay time

We assume a two-mirror Fabry–Pérot resonator of geometrical length , homogeneously filled with an active laser medium of refractive index . We define the reference situation, namely the passive resonator mode, for a resonator whose active medium is transparent, i.e., it does not introduce gain or absorption.

The round-trip time  of light travelling in the resonator with speed , where  is the speed of light in vacuum, and the free spectral range  are given by

Light in the longitudinal resonator mode of interest oscillates at the qth resonance frequency

The exponential outcoupling decay time  and the corresponding decay-rate constant  are related to the intensity reflectances  of the two resonator mirrors  by

The exponential intrinsic loss time  and the corresponding decay-rate constant  are related to the intrinsic round-trip loss  by

The exponential photon-decay time  and the corresponding decay-rate constant  of the passive resonator are then given by

Passive resonator mode: Lorentzian linewidth, Q-factor, coherence time and length

Besides the photon-decay time , the spectral-coherence properties of the passive resonator mode can be equivalently expressed by the following parameters. The FWHM Lorentzian linewidth  of the passive resonator mode that appears in the Schawlow–Townes equation is derived from the exponential photon-decay time  by Fourier transformation,

The Q-factor  is defined as the energy  stored in the resonator mode over the energy  lost per oscillation cycle,

where  is the number of photons in the mode. The coherence time  and coherence length  of light emitted from the mode are given by

Active resonator mode: Gain, photon-decay time, Lorentzian linewidth, Q-factor, coherence time and length

A value of  induces amplification, whereas  induces absorption of light at the resonance frequency , resulting in an elongated or shortened photon-decay time  of photons out of the active resonator mode, respectively,

The other four spectral-coherence properties of the active resonator mode are obtained in the same way as for the passive resonator mode. The Lorentzian linewidth is derived by Fourier transformation,

A value of  leads to gain narrowing, whereas  leads to absorption broadening of the spectral linewidth. The Q-factor is

The coherence time and length are

Spectral-coherence factor

The factor by which the photon-decay time is elongated by gain or shortened by absorption is introduced here as the spectral-coherence factor :

All five spectral-coherence parameters then scale by the same spectral-coherence factor :

Lasing resonator mode: Fundamental laser linewidth

With the number  of photons propagating inside the lasing resonator mode, the stimulated-emission and photon-decay rates are, respectively,

The spectral-coherence factor then becomes

The photon-decay time of the lasing resonator mode is

The fundamental laser linewidth is

This fundamental linewidth is valid for lasers with an arbitrary energy-level system, operating below, at, or above threshold, with the gain being smaller, equal, or larger compared to the losses, and in a cw or a transient lasing regime.

It becomes clear from its derivation that the fundamental laser linewidth is due to the semi-classical effect that the gain elongates the photon-decay time.

Continuous-wave laser: The gain is smaller than the losses

The spontaneous-emission rate into the lasing resonator mode is given by

Notably,  is always a positive rate, because one atomic excitation is converted into one photon in the lasing mode. It is the source term of laser radiation and must not be misinterpreted as "noise". The photon-rate equation for a single lasing mode reads

A CW laser is defined by a temporally constant number of photons in the lasing mode, hence . In a CW laser the stimulated- and spontaneous-emission rates together compensate the photon-decay rate. Consequently,

The stimulated-emission rate is smaller than the photon-decay rate or, colloquially, "the gain is smaller than the losses". This fact has been known for decades and exploited to quantify the threshold behavior of semiconductor lasers. Even far above laser threshold the gain is still a tiny bit smaller than the losses. It is exactly this small difference that induces the finite linewidth of a CW laser.

It becomes clear from this derivation that fundamentally the laser is an amplifier of spontaneous emission, and the cw laser linewidth is due to the semi-classical effect that the gain is smaller than the losses. Also in the quantum-optical approaches to the laser linewidth, based on the density-operator master equation, it can be verified that the gain is smaller than the losses.

Schawlow–Townes approximation

As mentioned above, it is clear from its historical derivation that the original Schawlow–Townes equation is a four-fold approximation of the fundamental laser linewidth. Starting from the fundamental laser linewidth  derived above, by applying the four approximations i.–iv. one then obtains the original Schawlow–Townes equation.

I.e., by applying the same four approximations i.–iv. to the fundamental laser linewidth  that were applied in the first derivation, the original Schawlow–Townes equation is obtained.

Thus, the fundamental laser linewidth is

whereas the original Schawlow–Townes equation is a four-fold approximation of this fundamental laser linewidth and is merely of historical interest.

Additional linewidth broadening and narrowing effects

Following its publication in 1958, the original Schawlow–Townes equation was extended in various ways. These extended equations often trade under the same name, the "Schawlow–Townes linewidth", thereby creating a veritable confusion in the available literature on the laser linewidth, as it is often unclear which particular extension of the original Schawlow–Townes equation the respective authors refer to.

Several semi-classical extensions intended to remove one or several of the approximations i.–iv. mentioned above, thereby making steps towards the fundamental laser linewidth derived above.

The following extensions may add to the fundamental laser linewidth:

Measurement of laser linewidth
One of the first methods used to measure the coherence of a laser was interferometry. A typical method to measure the laser linewidth is self-heterodyne interferometry. An alternative approach is the use of spectrometry.

Continuous lasers
The laser linewidth in a typical single-transverse-mode He–Ne laser (at a wavelength of 632.8 nm), in the absence of intracavity line narrowing optics, can be on the order of 1 GHz. Rare-earth-doped dielectric-based or semiconductor-based distributed-feedback lasers have typical linewidths on the order of 1 kHz. The laser linewidth from stabilized low-power continuous-wave lasers can be very narrow and reach down to less than 1 kHz.  Observed linewidths are larger than the fundamental laser linewidth due to technical noise (temporal fluctuations of the optical pump power or pump current, mechanical vibrations, refractive-index and length changes due to temperature fluctuations, etc.).

Pulsed lasers
Laser linewidth from high-power, high-gain pulsed-lasers, in the absence of intracavity line narrowing optics,  can be quite broad and in the case of powerful broadband dye lasers it can range from a few nm wide to as broad as 10 nm.

Laser linewidth from high-power high-gain pulsed laser oscillators, comprising line narrowing optics, is a function of the geometrical and dispersive features of the laser cavity.  To a first approximation the laser linewidth, in an optimized cavity, is directly proportional to the beam divergence of the emission multiplied by the inverse of the overall intracavity dispersion. That is,  
 

This is known as the cavity linewidth equation where  is the beam divergence and the term in parenthesis (elevated to −1) is the overall intracavity dispersion.  This equation was originally derived from classical optics. However, in 1992 Duarte derived this equation from quantum interferometric principles,  thus linking a quantum expression with the overall intracavity angular dispersion.

An optimized multiple-prism grating laser oscillator can deliver pulse emission in the kW regime at single-longitudinal-mode linewidths of  ≈ 350 MHz (equivalent to  ≈ 0.0004 nm at a laser wavelength of 590 nm). Since the pulse duration from these oscillators is about 3 ns, the laser linewidth performance is near the limit allowed by the Heisenberg uncertainty principle.

See also
Laser
Fabry–Perot interferometer
Beam divergence
Multiple-prism dispersion theory
Multiple-prism grating laser oscillator
N-slit interferometric equation
Oscillator linewidth
Solid state dye lasers

References

Linewidth